Walter Wilbert Welch (February 7, 1918 – July 16, 2015) was an American pastor and educator.  He joined the teaching faculty of Cornerstone University in 1941, becoming president in 1959, and Chancellor in 1985.

Cornerstone University
Welch was a pastor and held the degree of PhD. He took over the leadership of Cornerstone University as a small college meeting in a church basement, bought a 64-acre (26 hectares) cornfield, and built it into an accredited 4-year Christian liberal arts college.

Cornerstone University citation:
In 1959, with an enrollment of only 148 students, Dr. W. Wilbert Welch became the fifth president, a position he held until 1983. Under his leadership, the Bible Institute finally became a state-approved Bible college in 1963. In its new form, “Grand Rapids Baptist College and Seminary” was thus chartered to offer the Bachelor of Religious Education and Bachelor of Music degrees on the college side.

When told that the university's new clock tower was to be named in his honor, Welch's response was, "I appreciate it, but I don't need it.  Maybe the shock of it will kill me."

Ministry
North Casnovia Baptist Church, Bailey, Michigan
1951-59 Senior Pastor: Calvary Baptist Church, Muskegon, Michigan 
1959-83 President, Cornerstone University (formerly Grand Rapids Baptist Bible College)
1990-91 Interim Pastor: Calvary Baptist Church, Covington, Kentucky 
Biblical Evangelism boardmember

Legacy
W. Wilbert Welch Clock Tower article at WZZM-TV13 site
W. Wilbert Welch Clock Tower article at Grand Rapids Press

Published works

Books
A Performance Pattern for Pastors and Churches (Grand Rapids: Welch, 2002) 
The Man Your Church Should Know (Grand Rapids: Kregel, 2004) 
Theolog '67 (Grand Rapids: Grand Rapids Baptist Seminary, Spring 1967), editor and contributing author
Theolog '66 (Grand Rapids: Grand Rapids Baptist Seminary, Fall 1966), editor and contributing author

Radio messages on cassette
On file at Cedarville College
Christ's Imminent Return (1982)
The Great Tribulation (1982)
Just Reminiscing (1981)
The Loss of Spiritual Power (1980)
Neo-Evangelism: Parts I, II, III (1980)
The Importance of Stones (1977)
Training Soul-Winners (1973)
By Faith, We Understand (1964)
Touched to Build (1962)

Booklets and pamphlets
A Charge to Keep: The Book of First Timothy (Regular Baptist Press, 1982)
The Christian Mission and Fundamentalism
Conduct Becoming Saints – The Book of 1 Corinthians, Part 1, Chapters 1-8 (Regular Baptist Press, 1978)
Conduct Becoming Saints – The Book of 1 Corinthians, Part 2, Chapters 9-16 (Regular Baptist Press, 1978)
Decisions, Decisions, Will Someone Help Me?
Developing a Biblical Perspective Concerning Believers, Demons and Exorcism
Does Biblical Separation Destroy Christian Unity?
The Early Church - Problems and Progress: Book of Acts, Chapters 1-13 (Regular Baptist Press, 1976)
The Early Church - Problems and Progress: Book of Acts, Chapters 14-28 (Regular Baptist Press, 1976)
The Fine Art of Being a Pastor
The Trial of Your Faith: The Epistle of First Peter

Articles
On file at the Cornerstone University Archives, Miller Library
The Word of God in Our Society
Growing Old Isn’t All Bad
Programming For Progress
The Authority of the Word of God 
Attractive Churches 
Enjoyable Years for Senior Citizens
God’s Creative Wisdom for the Body or “Beautifying the Bones”
These Men Called Deacons—Who Are They, and Why?
Consideration For Seeking Balance
God’s Provisions for His Church
The Divine Human Cooperative—How Does God Work?
Yes, Christians Do Split Churches 
God’s Prescription for an Enjoyable Ministry
It Is Time To Refocus On The Sunday School
Understanding And Resolving Conflict 
The Man Your Church Should Know
To Resign or Not to Resign-That is the Question
Church Problems – Normal But Not Necessary 
Yes, Your Church Can Grow!
The Word of God in our Society
Christian Education and Evangelism
Position Paper Accreditation and Christian Colleges
The Pastor and Church Administration 
New Testament Evangelism 
Position Paper Two, Grand Rapids Baptist College and Seminary and Changing Standards
Baptist Holiness
The Divine Directive
The One Who Works in You
The Fundamentalists’ Hour
Let’s Have Some Demonstrations
Position Paper: Creative Days of Genesis 
Position Paper: The Use of Translations (green folder)
The Rapture of  the Church
The Two Judgments
The Final Destination of the Righteous and Wicked
Let’s Talk About the Second Coming of the Lord Jesus Christ
Is the Bible the Word of God?
Heaven
What is Hell like?
The Two Resurrections
Radio Bible Class

Online publications
Biblical Evangelist (March/April 2006)

Quotes
“[Paul’s] instruction that the women of the church ‘adorn’ themselves modestly is not part of an ‘anti-attractive’ campaign. In fact, he said they should ‘adorn themselves,’ not detract. Their apparel was to be modest. There was to be no extravagance or undue emphasis placed on a woman’s physical attractiveness.” (A Charge to Keep, pg. 43 RBP, 1982)

Roles at Cornerstone University
1941: Teaching Faculty
1959-1983: President
1983-2015: Chancellor
1991: Interim President

References

American Christian theologians
1918 births
2015 deaths
Cornerstone University faculty